Edward (or Ed or Eddie) Perry may refer to:

Edward A. Perry (1831–1889), American Civil War general and later Governor of Florida
Ed Perry (born 1974), American football player who played for the Miami Dolphins
Eddie Perry (footballer) (1909–1996), Welsh international footballer and club manager
Edward Perry Warren (1860–1928), American art collector and author
Edward Perry (industrialist) (1800–1869), English industrialist and twice mayor of Wolverhampton
Edward Perry (Scottish footballer) (born 1934), Scottish footballer
George Edward Perry, known as Ted, English classical record producer, founder of Hyperion Records

See also
Edmund Perry, American student shot dead by a policeman
Edwin Perry, New Zealand politician